The 1992 Eisenhower Trophy took place October 1 to 4 at Capilano Golf & Country Club and Marine Drive Golf Club near Vancouver, Canada. It was the 18th World Amateur Team Championship for the Eisenhower Trophy. The tournament was a 72-hole stroke play team event with 49 four-man teams, 10 more than the previous highest, which was 39. The best three scores for each round counted towards the team total. The leading teams played the third round at Marine Drive and the final round at Capilano. This was the first time two courses were used for the championship.

New Zealand won the Eisenhower Trophy for the first time, finishing seven strokes ahead of the silver medalists, United States. Australia and France tied for third place and took bronze medals.  Phil Tataurangi had the lowest individual score, 9-under-par 271, one stroke better than fellow-New Zealander Michael Campbell.

Teams
49 teams contested the event. Each team had four players with the exception of India who only had three. 

The following table lists the players on the leading teams.

Scores

Source:

Individual leaders
There was no official recognition for the lowest individual scores.

Source:

References

External links
Record Book on International Golf Federation website (part) 

Eisenhower Trophy
Eisenhower Trophy
Eisenhower Trophy
Eisenhower Trophy
Eisenhower Trophy